Michael Ian Shamos (born April 21, 1947) is an American mathematician, attorney, book author, journal editor, consultant and company director. He is (with Franco P. Preparata) the author of Computational Geometry (Springer-Verlag, 1985), which was for many years the standard textbook in computational geometry, and is known for the Shamos–Hoey sweep line algorithm for line segment intersection detection and for the rotating calipers technique for finding the width and diameter of a geometric figure. His publications also include works on electronic voting, the game of billiards, and intellectual property law in the digital age.

He was a fellow of Sigma Xi (1974–83), had an IBM Fellowship at Yale University (1974–75), was SIAM National Lecturer (1977–78), distinguished lecturer in computer science at the University of Rochester (1978), visited McGill University (1979), and belonged to the Duquesne University Law Review (1980–81). He won the first annual Black & White Scotch Achiever's Award in 1991 for contributions to bagpipe musicography, and the Industry Service Award of the Billiard and Bowling Institute of America, 1996, for contributions to billiard history. Since 2001 he is a Billiard Worldcup Association official referee.

He has been editor in chief of the Journal of Privacy Technology (2003–2006), a member of the editorial boards of Electronic Commerce Research Journal and the Pittsburgh Journal of Technology, Law and Policy, and a contributing editor of Billiards Digest magazine.

Shamos is the author of The New Illustrated Encyclopedia of Billiards (Lyons, 1999) among other related works, and is the curator of the Billiards Museum and Archive.

Michael Shamos is the Director of the MS in Artificial Intelligence and Innovation program at Carnegie Mellon University. Before that, he was the Director of the MS in IT eBusiness Technology program.

Education
Shamos received a PhD in 1978 at Yale under David P. Dobkin.

References

Resume of Michael Ian Shamos

1947 births
Living people
20th-century American mathematicians
21st-century American mathematicians
Researchers in geometric algorithms
Voting theorists
University of Rochester faculty
Duquesne University faculty
Cue sports writers and broadcasters